Daniel "Dan" Hollander (born May 9, 1972) is an American figure skater. He is a two-time Vienna Cup champion (1995, 1997) and a two-time U.S. national bronze medalist (1996, 1997). He finished tenth at the 1996 World Championships in Edmonton, Alberta, Canada.

In the 1996–97 season, Hollander trained under Diana Ronayne in St. Clair Shores, Michigan. In 1999, he sustained a number of injuries that forced him to turn professional. He became known for his comedic skating programs.

Hollander coaches figure skating in Maryland.  On October 17, 2015, he married a skating coach, Emily Chase, in Bloomfield Hills, Michigan. Their daughter, Arianna Alina, was born on May 13, 2016.

Programs

Competitive highlights
GP: Champions Series / Grand Prix

References

External links

Official website of Dan Hollander
Dan Hollander at Figure Skaters Online

1972 births
American male single skaters
Living people
Sportspeople from Royal Oak, Michigan
20th-century American people
21st-century American people